Cityterminalen is the central bus station of Stockholm. It is situated in the Norrmalm city district, and is connected by a tunnel to the Stockholm Central Station. Most long range bus lines in Stockholm have a stop in Cityterminalen. Construction started on July 3, 1985, and the station opened for traffic on January 20, 1989.

The station is adjacent to the Stockholm World Trade Center.

See also 
 T-Centralen

References

External links

 Official website

Bus stations in Sweden
Transport in Stockholm
Buildings and structures in Stockholm
1989 establishments in Sweden